This is a list of men's collegiate wrestling programs in the United States that compete in NCAA Division I. For the 2021–22 NCAA Division I men's wrestling season, 78 schools in the United States sponsor Division I varsity men's wrestling.  This list reflects each team's conference affiliation as of that season.

Wrestling conferences
 The Big Ten Conference (Big Ten) is the only all-sport conference whose members (14) all compete in wrestling.
 The six wrestling schools in the Atlantic Coast Conference (ACC) are all currently full members of the conference.
 The Mid-American Conference (MAC) has eight affiliate members in addition to five full members after adding the seven members of the Eastern Wrestling League (EWL) as new affiliates starting in the 2019–20 season.
 The Pac-12 Conference (Pac-12) has six wrestling members in 2019–20. It had operated with three full members plus two affiliates after the elimination of Boise State's program, but restored its wrestling membership to the six required for NCAA recognition by adding Little Rock as an associate member in 2019–20.
 The Southern Conference (SoCon) with three full members meets the membership requirement by having six associate members, with the newest associate, Bellarmine (in transition from Division II), being the most recent addition in 2020–21.
 The Eastern Intercollegiate Wrestling Association (EIWA) is a wrestling-only conference that had 16 members in the 2018–19 season, and added another member for 2019–20 and beyond. Six members are also full members of the Ivy League and compete for that conference's dual meet championship during the EIWA season. EIWA member Franklin & Marshall is the only Division III school competing in Division I wrestling. Joining for 2019–20 were the LIU Sharks, created by the merger of Long Island University's two athletic programs—the Division I LIU Brooklyn Blackbirds, which did not sponsor wrestling, and the Division II LIU Post Pioneers, which did. The former LIU Post wrestling program has continued to compete as the LIU Sharks.
 The Big 12 Conference (Big 12) had lost its NCAA recognition when wrestling membership fell to only four full member schools, despite the fact that three of those four schools had won a combined 49 NCAA Division I wrestling team titles.  On July 29, 2015, the Big 12 announced that the members of the Western Wrestling Conference (which had six members, but was not recognized by the NCAA) had been accepted as affiliate members of the Big 12, increasing the number of participating schools to ten and restoring the conference's automatic bids. The Big 12 has since added two more wrestling affiliates, though one of these, namely Fresno State, dropped the sport after the 2020–21 season. California Baptist was officially granted Division I status in August 2022. Missouri, previously a full Big 12 member before moving to the Southeastern Conference, where it is currently the only school that sponsors wrestling, moved back to the conference as an affiliate in 2021-22 after spending the previous nine years as an affiliate member of the MAC.

Current Division I schools

Notes

New programs

In transition

Map of Division I men's wrestling programs

Map of Defunct Division I men's wrestling programs

See also
 Collegiate wrestling
 List of NCAA Division II wrestling programs
 List of NCAA Divisions II and III schools competing in NCAA Division I sports

References

External links
NCAA Organization website
NCAA Competition website

Wrestling
NCAA Division I wrestling